Tsiroanomandidy Airport is an airport in Tsiroanomandidy, Bongolava, Madagascar .

Airlines and destinations

References

Airports in Madagascar
Bongolava